J. P. Riddle Stadium is a stadium in Fayetteville, North Carolina owned by Fayetteville Technical Community College (FTCC). It is primarily used for baseball and was the home of the Fayetteville Generals/Cape Fear Crocs baseball team. The ballpark has a capacity of 2,500 to 5,000 people and opened in 1987. J. P. Riddle Stadium is currently home to the FTCC Trojans. It was the 19-year home of the Fayetteville SwampDogs of the collegiate summer baseball Coastal Plain League. The SwampDogs announced on October 3, 2019 that they would sit out the 2020 Coastal Plain League season and relocate afterwards, having failed to reach a new lease agreement. The stadium has been nicknamed the Swamp.

The Carolina Coyotes of the collegiate summer baseball Old North State League played the 2020 season at J. P. Riddle Stadium, allowing only 25 spectators per game due to the COVID-19 pandemic. In 2021, the team was renamed the Fayetteville Chutes.

References

Sports venues in Cumberland County, North Carolina
Minor league baseball venues
Baseball venues in North Carolina
Buildings and structures in Fayetteville, North Carolina
1987 establishments in North Carolina
Sports venues completed in 1987